Erkki Johansson (27 July 1917 – 7 October 1984) was a Finnish wrestler. He competed in the men's freestyle bantamweight at the 1948 Summer Olympics.

References

External links
 

1917 births
1984 deaths
Finnish male sport wrestlers
Olympic wrestlers of Finland
Wrestlers at the 1948 Summer Olympics
Sportspeople from Vyborg